This is a list of notable people associated with Carnegie Mellon University in the United States of America.

Notable students and alumni

Nobel laureates

Turing Award recipients

Wolf Prize recipients
Raoul Bott (Ph.D. 1949), Wolf Prize in Mathematics, 2000

Enrico Fermi Award winners
George Cowan (Ph.D. 1950), nuclear scientist who was involved in the Manhattan Project, the U.S. atomic initiative during World War II; founder of the Santa Fe Institute

Stockholm Prize in Criminology winners
Daniel Nagin (B.S, M.S. 1971, Ph.D. 1976, Professor), criminologist, 2014

National Medal of Science recipients
Raoul Bott (Ph.D. 1949), Mathematical, Statistical, and Computer Sciences, 1987
Allen Newell (Ph.D 1957, Professor), Mathematical, Statistical, and Computer Sciences, 1992
George Pake (B.S., M.S. 1945), Physical Sciences, 1987
Frederick Rossini (B.S. 1925, M.S. 1926, DSc (hon.) 1948), Chemistry

National Medal of Technology and Innovation recipients
Robert Dennard (Ph.D. 1958), dynamic random access memory (DRAM), 1988
Stephanie Kwolek (B.S. 1946), inventor of Kevlar, 1996
Mary Shaw (Ph.D. 1972), software architecture pioneer, 2012
Frank L. Stulen (1943), numerical control of machine tools, 1985

MacArthur Fellows
Luis von Ahn (Ph.D. 2005), Carnegie Mellon professor of computer science, 2006
Stefan Savage (B.S. 1991), professor at UC San Diego, 2017
Dawn Song (M.S. 1999), Carnegie Mellon professor of computer science (2002–2007), currently professor at UC Berkeley, 2010

Business
Paul Allaire (M.B.A 1966), former Xerox director (1986–1990) CEO (1990–2000) and Chairman (1991–2000)
Kushagra Bajaj (B.S.), Vice Chairman of Bajaj Group
Ted Decker, (M.B.A. 1993), CEO and president of The Home Depot
Francisco D'Souza (Master of Science in Industrial Administration 1992), CEO of Cognizant Technology Solutions
Dina Dublon (Master of Science in Industrial Administration 1979), former EVP and CFO of JP Morgan Chase; board member of Microsoft, Accenture, PepsiCo, and Carnegie Mellon University
Marc Ewing (B.S. 1992), co-founder of Red Hat Inc., maker of Red Hat Enterprise Linux
Yoshiaki Fujimori (Master of Science in Industrial Administration 1981), President and CEO of Lixil Group 
Scott Griffith (1981), Chairman and CEO of Zipcar
Cormac Kinney (B.S. 1993, Master of Science in Industrial Administration 1994), software inventor and entrepreneur
Alexander Knaster (B.S. 1980), billionaire private equity investor; founder and chairman of Pamplona Capital Management
Jim Levy (B.S. 1965, Master of Science in Industrial Administration 1966), founding CEO of Activision (1979–1986)
Frank Marshall (B.S.), former Director of Juniper Networks, former Vice President of Cisco (1992–1997)
Gerald C. Meyers (B.S., M.S.), former Chairman of American Motors
Ted Nierenberg (B.S. 1944), founder of Dansk International Designs
David Tepper (Master of Science in Industrial Administration 1982), founder and Chairman of Appaloosa Management
Madhavi Vuppalapati, CEO and Chairperson of Prithvi Information Solutions.
Romesh Wadhwani (M.S., Ph.D.), billionaire private equity investor; founder and chairman of Symphony Technology Group
Charles Erwin Wilson (1909), CEO of General Motors (1946–1953), President of General Motors (1941–1953) (See also: Government and politics section)
Sulajja Firodia Motwani, Indian woman entrepreneur
Sunil Wadhwani, co-founder of Mastech Digital and IGATE
Brian Olsavsky (M.B.A), CFO of Amazon
Mario Reimers, 1999 MSIA, CEO Reico Capital, Venture Capitalist

Science and technology

Performing arts, film, television and video games

Visual arts

Architecture and design

Roger Duffy, architect
Dan Friedman, graphic designer
David M. Kelley (B.S. 1973), co-founder of IDEO
Christian Schwartz, type designer
Steven Song, architect and theoretician
Nader Ardalan, Architect of Harvard Business School (ICMS) in Tehran, Iran (1975).

Government and politics

Academia

Educators

Members of National Academy of Sciences

Members of National Academy of Engineering

Other prominent faculty

Literature

Sports

NFL

Notable faculty

Nobel laureates

Turing Award recipients
Alan Perlis (B.S. 1943, Professor 1956–1971), compiler construction, 1966 – first Turing Award winner
Allen Newell (Ph.D 1957, Professor 1961–1992) and Herbert A. Simon (Professor), artificial intelligence, 1975
Dana S. Scott (Professor 1981–2003), nondeterministic machines, 1976
Robert Floyd (Professor 1963–1968), methodologies for the creation of efficient and reliable software, 1978
Raj Reddy (Professor 1969–present), artificial intelligence, 1994
Manuel Blum (Professor 1999–2018), computational complexity theory, 1995
Edmund M. Clarke (Professor 1982–2020), model checking, 2007
Leslie Valiant (Professor 1973–1974), machine learning, 2010
William Mattis (Professor 1976-1993), artificial intelligence, 2012

Kyoto Prize recipients
Takeo Kanade (Professor), information science, 2016

Wolf Prize recipients
John Pople (Professor 1964–1993), Wolf Prize in Chemistry, 1992
Krzysztof Matyjaszewski (Professor), Wolf Prize in Chemistry, 2011

Stockholm Prize in Criminology winners
Alfred Blumstein (Professor), operations researcher and criminologist, 2007

National Medal of Science recipients
Herbert A. Simon (Professor), Behavior and Social Sciences, 1986
Paul Lauterbur (Research Associate, Mellon Institute, 1951–1953), Physical Sciences, 1987
Allen Newell (Ph.D 1957, Professor), Mathematical, Statistical, and Computer Sciences, 1992

National Medal of Technology recipients
Paul Lauterbur (Research Associate, Mellon Institute, 1951–1953), magnetic resonance technology, 1988
Watts Humphrey (Professor), software engineering, 2003
Mary Shaw (Professor), software engineering, 2014

MacArthur Fellows
Luis von Ahn (Ph.D. 2005), assistant professor of computer science, 2006
Yoky Matsuoka, assistant professor affiliated with the Robotics Institute, the Department of Mechanical Engineering, and the Center for the Neural Basis of Cognition (2001–2006), 2007
Anna Deavere Smith, acting instructor (1970–1971), 1996
Dawn Song (M.S. 1999), professor of computer science (2002–2007), 2010
Terrance Hayes, professor of poetry (2001–2013)

Members of National Academy of Sciences

Members of National Academy of Engineering

Other prominent faculty

Igor Ansoff (Professor), "father of strategic management" and Professor of Industrial Administration
Jerome Apt (Professor), former NASA astronaut and now Professor of Technology; Executive Director of Carnegie Mellon Electricity Industry Center, Graduate School of Industrial Administration
Elizabeth Bailey (Professor 1983–1991), former Dean and Professor of Economics, Industrial Administration and Public Policy, Graduate School of Industrial Administration, now John C. Hower Professor of Business and Public Policy at Wharton School of the University of Pennsylvania
Lenore Blum (Professor), renowned for being a National Science Foundation Career Advancement Award winner and for her contributions to Computer Science, wife of Manuel Blum
Peter Braam (Professor), computer scientist, founder of Lustre file system, Intermezzo file system
Kathleen Carley (Professor), Computational sociologist and pioneer of dynamic network analysis
William W. Cooper (Professor), professor of operations research and accounting at the Tepper School of Business and founding Dean of the Heinz College
Edward Creutz (Professor), physics, the Manhattan Project
Lorrie Cranor (Professor), expert in information privacy and Chief Technologist of the Federal Trade Commission
Anthony Daniels (Adjunct Professor), Actor famous for portraying C-3PO in the Star Wars films
Robyn Dawes (Professor), pioneer in the field of mathematical psychology
Scott Dodelson (Professor, 2017–present), astrophysicist and former Fermilab scientist
David Farber (Professor, 2003–present), co-creator of ARPANET and former Chief Technologist for the FCC
Richard Florida (Professor, 1987–2005), economist and author of Rise of the Creative Class
David Garlan (Professor, 1990–present), a pioneer in software architecture and self-adaptive software systems
James Goodby (Professor, 1989–present), Distinguished Service Professor of Engineering and Public Policy, former U.S. Foreign Service Officer including US Ambassador to Finland (1980–1981)
John Heinz III (faculty member, 1970–1971), Senator from Pennsylvania
Robert Hess (1938–1994), President of Brooklyn College
Israel Hicks (1943–2010), stage director who presented August Wilson's entire 10-play Pittsburgh Cycle
Henry Hornbostel (Professor), helped found the Carnegie Mellon School of Architecture; designed the original buildings on campus
Watts Humphrey (Professor), former Vice President of IBM, Fellow of Software Engineering Institute
Jeffrey Hunker (Professor), Senior Director for Critical Infrastructure for the United States National Security Council (1999–2001), Deputy Assistant to the Secretary of Commerce (1996–1998), senior Department of Commerce official for environmental policy (1996–1998), former Senior Policy Advisor to the Secretary of Commerce (1993–1996), former Dean of the Heinz College
 Robert Kaplan (Professor), co-creator of the Balanced Scorecard
Michael Keaton (Adjunct Professor), actor known for films such as Beetlejuice, Batman, and Batman Returns
Roberta Klatzky (Professor), cognitive scientist and leading researcher in haptics
Mordecai Lawner, actor and former faculty member for the theater program
Jennifer Lerner, decision scientist and psychologist in the Department of Social and Decision Sciences
Golan Levin, new media artist and current faculty member of the School of Art
Margot Livesey, author of six novels, short stories, and essays on fiction
George Loewenstein (Professor), pioneer in the field of Behavioural Economics and faculty in the Department of Social and Decision Sciences
Alex John London (Clara L. West Professor of Ethics and Philosophy), Director of the Center for Ethics and Policy at Carnegie Mellon University, Elected Fellow of the Hastings Center; prominent bioethicist 
Brian MacWhinney (Professor), leading language acquisition researcher and creator of CHILDES database
Allan Meltzer (Professor), chairperson of a special U.S. congressional commission that studied how the World Bank and the International Monetary Fund operated; it made its recommendations for changes in March 2000 in its report to the U.S. Congress
Richard Rashid (Professor, 1979–1991), computer scientist, Microsoft Research SVP
Robert V. Rice (Professor), biochemist and leading researcher in smooth muscle myosin
Scott Sandage (Professor), noted cultural historian in the Dietrich College of Humanities and Social Sciences
Robert Schmertz (Professor), folk artist and professor of architecture
Walter Dill Scott (Professor, 1916–1918), pioneer in applied psychology, President of the American Psychological Association, President of Northwestern University
Mel Shapiro (Head of Drama Department), Tony Award-winning writer and director
Robert S. Siegler (Professor), Teresa Heinz Professor of Psychology at Carnegie Mellon University and recipient of the American Psychological Association's 2005 Distinguished Scientific Contribution Award
Daniel Sleator (Professor), Paris Kanellakis Award-winning professor of computer science known for inventing data structures such as the splay tree
Alfred Spector (Professor), Vice President of Research and Special Initiatives at Google
Latanya Sweeney (Professor), former Chief Technologist of the Federal Trade Commission
Joe William Trotter Jr. (Professor), eminent scholar of African American labor and urban life in the Dietrich College of Humanities and Social Sciences, and an elected member of the American Academy of Arts and Sciences
Honus Wagner, baseball and basketball coach, one of the first five members of the Baseball Hall of Fame
Arnold R. Weber (Professor and Provost), professor in economics and public policy at Carnegie Mellon and President of the University of Colorado and Northwestern University
Jerome Wolken (1917–1999), biophysicist and head of biology department
Clarence Zener (Professor, 1968–1993), theoretical physicist, namesake of the Zener diode, Zener voltage, and Zener pinning

Presidents of Carnegie Mellon University
Arthur Hamerschlag, 1903–1922
Thomas Baker, 1922–1935
Robert Doherty, 1936–1950
John Warner, 1950–1965
Guyford Stever, 1965–1972
Richard Cyert, 1972–1990
Robert Mehrabian, 1990–1997
Jared Cohon, 1997–2013
Subra Suresh, 2013–2017
Farnam Jahanian, 2018–present

Founders and major benefactors of Carnegie Mellon University
Andrew Carnegie, industrialist and philanthropist who founded and endowed the university as the Carnegie Technical Schools in 1900
William S. Dietrich II, steel industrialist whose gift prompted the renaming of the College of Humanities and Social Sciences to the Dietrich College of Humanities and Social Sciences
Teresa Heinz, and the Heinz family, heirs to the H.J. Heinz Company fortune; political family who renamed the School of Urban and Public Affairs to the Heinz College after United States Senator H. John Heinz III
David Tepper, billionaire Wall Street hedge fund manager whose gift renamed the Graduate School of Industrial Administration to the Tepper School of Business

The Mellon Family of Pittsburgh:
Andrew W. Mellon, United States Secretary of the Treasury from 1921 to 1932; co-founded the Mellon Institute of Research in 1913
Paul Mellon, philanthropist, horse breeder, facilitator of the merger between the Carnegie Institute of Technology and the Mellon Institute to form Carnegie Mellon University
Richard B. Mellon, president of Mellon Bank; co-founded the Mellon Institute of Research in 1913
Richard King Mellon, president and chairman of Mellon Bank, known for his urban renewal program in Pittsburgh and the founder of the School of Urban and Public Affairs
William Larimer Mellon, Sr., founder of Gulf Oil and the Graduate School of Industrial Administration

Fictional alumni
Eleanor Bartlet, first daughter of the United States in The West Wing
Will Bailey, White House Deputy Communications Director in The West Wing
Doctor Colette Green, research associate from the PC game Half-Life: Decay
Dr. Bunsen Honeydew, scientist from The Muppet Show who graduated from "Carnegie-Melonhead University"
Brian Kinney and Ben Bruckner, main characters in Queer as Folk
Randall and Beth Pearson, characters on This is Us, met while attending the school
Sebastian Shaw, the Black King of the Hellfire Club of the Marvel Universe (Earth-616)
Bethany Sloane, main character of the film Dogma
Jaime Sommers, title character of The Bionic Woman

See also
:Category:Carnegie Mellon University faculty

References

Lists of people by university or college in Pennsylvania